Lianhu District is one of 11 urban districts of the prefecture-level city of Xi'an, the capital of Shaanxi Province, Northwest China. The district borders the districts of Weiyang to the north, Xincheng to the east, Beilin to the southeast, and Yanta to the southeast. It is divided into the following administrative divisions:

References

Districts of Xi'an